The Nyah-Nyah West United Football Netball Club, nicknamed the Demons, is an Australian rules football and netball club based in Nyah, a town in northern Victoria. The Demons teams currently play in the Central Murray League.

History 
United was formed in 1978 when clubs Nyah FC and Nyah West FC of the Mid Murray Football League were elected to merge. The club's senior team initially struggled following their formation. Following the 1996 season, the club moved to the Central Murray Football League following the merge of the Mid Murray, Northern and Echuca Football Leagues.

Premierships

Club members

Presidents

Life Members

Matt Curran
Dennis Pretty
Peter Thompson
John Correnti
Phyllis Curran
Gary Harrop
Kerrie Shadbolt
Max Wilkinson
Brian 'Snow' Duffy
Keith Blackman
Frank Curran
Tom Evans
Rob 'Chesty' Coburn
Geoffrey Bradbury
Brian 'Pat' Harrop
Pat Phelan
Bill Gleeson
Vicki Allen
Owen Connick
David Henson
Andrew Flanagan
Peter Burge
Maureen Saville
Ash Thompson

Awards
In 2017, David 'Snail' Henson was awarded the Auskick Coordinator of the Year for Victoria, for 'excellent knowledge of teaching skills and game fundamentals' and also became a life member of the club.

See also
Nyah Football Club
Nyah
Nyah West

References

External links
 SportsTG website

Australian rules football clubs in Victoria (Australia)
Central Murray Football League
1978 establishments in Australia
Netball teams in Victoria (Australia)